Luca Vildoza (born August 11, 1995) is an Argentine professional basketball player for Crvena zvezda of the Adriatic League and the EuroLeague.

Professional career

Quilmes (2012–2017)
Vildoza began his career with the Argentine 1st Division (LNB) club Quilmes, in the 2011–12 LNB season. He then played in the Argentine 2nd Division with Quilmes during the TNA 2012–13 season. He spent the next three seasons playing in the top-tier level Argentine League with Quilmes.

Baskonia (2016–2021)
In 2016, Vildoza signed a four-year contract with the Liga ACB club Baskonia. However, Baskonia loaned him back to Quilmes for the 2016–17 season where he averaged 16.9 points and 3.9 assists per game. He rejoined Baskonia for the 2017–18 season and made a debut in the EuroLeague. Over 24 EuroLeague games, he averaged 4.5 points, 2 assists, and 1.3 rebounds per game. In the Liga ACB, he appeared in 25 games and averaged 5.9 points while shooting 50% from the field goal and 40.4% from the three-point line. Baskonia made the ACB Playoffs Finals that season and lost the final 3–1 to Real Madrid.

In the 2018–19 season, Vildoza's role in the team increased, and so did his stats, as he averaged 9.1 points and 3.8 assists over 34 games of the EuroLeague. In March 2019, Vildoza signed a contract extension with Baskonia to stay until the end of 2023–24 season. In the Liga ACB, he appeared in 32 games, averaging 9.3 points per game. In the ACB Quarterfinals, Baskonia lost 2–0 to Zaragoza.

Milwaukee Bucks (2022)
On May 6, 2021, Vildoza signed with the New York Knicks, but was waived on October 3 after playing two 2021 NBA Summer League games. On October 5, Vildoza announced that he had undergone surgery on his right foot.

On April 6, 2022, Vildoza was signed by the Milwaukee Bucks to a reported two-year contract.

On April 22, 2022, Vildoza made his NBA debut in game three of a first-round playoff series against the Chicago Bulls. Vildoza was subbed in during the fourth quarter at the 8:02 mark. Vildoza made a three-point shot, grabbed a rebound, recorded two assists, and recorded two steals as the Bucks won 111–81. On July 5, he was waived by the Bucks. On July 9, the Bucks re-signed him to an Exhibit 10 contract.

Crvena zvezda (2022–present)
On October 14, 2022, Vildoza was signed by Crvena zvezda mts of the Adriatic League and the EuroLeague to a reported two-year contract. At the end of the month, he received ABA League Player of the Month Award.

National team career
Vildoza was a member of the junior national teams of Argentina. He played with Argentina's junior national team at the 2012 FIBA Under-17 World Cup. He is also a member of the senior men's Argentine national basketball team. With Argentina's senior team, he has played at the 2014 ODESUR Games, the 2015 Pan American Games, the 2016 South American Championship, and the 2017 FIBA AmeriCup.

In 2019, Vildoza took part in the team that won the Pan American gold medal in Lima. Vildoza was included in the Argentine squad for the 2019 FIBA Basketball World Cup and clinched the silver medal with Argentina, which emerged as runners-up to Spain at the 2019 FIBA Basketball World Cup.

Career statistics

NBA

Playoffs

|-
| style="text-align:left;"| 2022
| style="text-align:left;"| Milwaukee
| 7 || 0 || 2.4 || .333 || .200 ||  || .3 || .6 || .3 || .0 || .7
|- class="sortbottom"
| style="text-align:center;" colspan="2"|Career
| 7 || 0 || 2.4 || .333 || .200 ||  || .3 || .6 || .3 || .0 || .7

EuroLeague

|-
| style="text-align:left;"|2017–18
| style="text-align:left;" rowspan="3"|Baskonia
| 24 || 2 || 13.2 || .422 || .412 || .696 || 1.3 || 2.0 || .5 || .1 || 4.5 || 3.9
|-
| style="text-align:left;"|2018–19
| 34 || 17 || 22.5 || .403 || .372 || .879 || 2.3 || 3.8 || 1.1 || .1 || 9.1 || 9.6
|-
| style="text-align:left;"| 2020–21
| 32 || 18|| 25.1 || .410 || .388 || .761 || 2.0 || 3.5 || 1.6 || .1 || 10.3 || 10.2
|-

References

External links

 Luca Vildoza at acb.com 
 DLuca Vildoza at draftexpress.com
 Luca Vildoza at euroleague.net
 Luca Vildoza at fiba.com
 Luca Vildoza at latinbasket.com
 

1995 births
Living people
2019 FIBA Basketball World Cup players
ABA League players
Argentine expatriate basketball people in Serbia
Argentine expatriate basketball people in Spain
Argentine men's basketball players
Basketball players at the 2019 Pan American Games
Basketball players at the 2020 Summer Olympics
Competitors at the 2014 South American Games
Italian expatriate basketball people in Serbia
Italian expatriate basketball people in Spain
Italian men's basketball players
KK Crvena zvezda players
Liga ACB players
Medalists at the 2019 Pan American Games
Milwaukee Bucks players
Olympic basketball players of Argentina
Pan American Games gold medalists for Argentina
Pan American Games medalists in basketball
People from Quilmes
Point guards
Quilmes de Mar del Plata basketball players
Saski Baskonia players
Shooting guards
South American Games gold medalists for Argentina
South American Games medalists in basketball
Sportspeople from Buenos Aires Province